Techno India university( (TIU) is a private university in Kolkata, which is in the state of West Bengal in India.

Controversies

Ragging
In August 2017, a freshman student with Engineering major reported a ragging case with his parents. This matter was unveiled when ABP Ananda telecast the news.

See also
List of institutions of higher education in West Bengal
Education in India
Education in West Bengal

References

External links
 Official Website
University Grants Commission

Private universities in India
Universities in Kolkata
Universities and colleges in North 24 Parganas district
Educational institutions established in 2012
2012 establishments in West Bengal